Polana is a genus of leafhoppers in the family Cicadellidae. There are at least 140 described species in Polana.

See also
 List of Polana species

References

Further reading

External links

 

Iassinae
Cicadellidae genera